The Naranjeros de Hermosillo are a professional baseball team in the Mexican Pacific League based in Hermosillo, Sonora. The Naranjeros are one of the most successful teams in the league with 16 titles and they were the first Mexico team to win the Caribbean Series, doing so in Santo Domingo, Dominican Republic in 1976.

History
The team was established in 1945 as Queliteros de Hermosillo. In 1947, the Queliteros won their first championship in the Liga de la Costa del Pacífico (Pacific Coast League), the competition that preceded the Mexican Pacific League. The club changed its name to the current Naranjeros in the 50s and won the Pacific Coast League back to back in the 1955–56 and 1956–57 seasons. The Naranjeros played in the Estadio de la Casa del Pueblo that was later renamed to Estadio Fernando M. Ortiz.

Hermosillo repeated the feat of winning the league championship twice in a row in the 1960–61 and 1961–62 seasons, both times under manager Virgilio Arteaga. They won the league again in the 1963–64 season. During these years, legendary player Héctor Espino was part of the team.

The Naranjeros won the 1970–71 season and therefore became the first Pacific League team to represent Mexico in the 1971 Caribbean Series. In 1972 the team moved to the Estadio Coloso del Choyal. They won the 1974–75 and 1975–76 seasons back to back and participated in the 1976 Caribbean Series.

The Naranjeros' victory at the 1976 Caribbean Series in Santo Domingo was the first ever by a Mexican team. The club was managed by Benjamín "Cananea" Reyes and included players such as Héctor Espino (1B), Sergio "Kalimán" Robles (C), Celerino Sánchez (3B), Elliot Willis (2B), Arnoldo de Hoyos (CF), George Brunett (P) and Jerry Hairston Sr. (LF). Again under Cananea Reyes, the Naranjeros won the 1979–80 season. With Tom Harmon as manager, Hermosillo won the 1981–82, 1989–90 and 1991–92 seasons.

In the 1993–94, 1994–95 and 2000–01 seasons, the Naranjeros won the Mexican Pacific League, led by manager Derek Bryant. Under Lorenzo Bundy, Hermosillo won the 2006–07 season and were champions again in the 2009–10 season with Homar Rojas as manager.

In 2013, the Naranjeros moved to Estadio Sonora. During that season, the team won its seventeenth league title and the 2014 Caribbean Series with Matías Carrillo as manager.

Championships

Stadium
In its early days, the team played at Estadio Fernando M. Ortiz, also known as "La Casa del Pueblo." Since 1972, the Naranjeros have been playing in their home stadium, Estadio De Beisbol Héctor Espino, named after the greatest Mexican baseball player in history, Héctor Espino. Since 2013 they have played their home games at Estadio de Beisbol Sonora.

Roster

Notable players
Miguel Sotelo
Francisco Barrios
Maury Wills
Alex Treviño
Héctor Espino
Ángel Moreno
Sergio (Kaliman) Robles
Cornelio Garcia
Ramon Arano
Pepe Peña
Narciso Elvira
Ronny Henderson
Celerino Sánchez
Fernando Valenzuela
Elmer Dessens
Maximino León
Erubiel Durazo
Vinny Castilla
Jorge de la Rosa
Édgar González
Curt Schilling
Larry Walker
Carlos Gastelum
Luis Garcia
Jerry Owens

References

External links
 Official site

Hermosillo Naranjeros
Sport in Hermosillo
Sports teams in Sonora
Baseball teams established in 1958
1958 establishments in Mexico